Spîrlea is a Romanian surname. Notable people with the surname include:

Dumitru Spîrlea  (born 1950), Romanian modern pentathlete
Irina Spîrlea (born 1974), Romanian tennis player, daughter of Dumitru 

Romanian-language surnames